Ahmed Lakhrif ( – 1954, Smara) is a Moroccan politician of the Istiqlal Party. Between 2007 and 2008, he held the position of Secretary of State for Foreign Affairs in the cabinet of Abbas El Fassi. He was dismissed from this office on 22 December 2008 when he acquired the Spanish citizenship. He is a member of the CORCAS (Royal Advisory Council for Saharan Affairs).

See also
Cabinet of Morocco

References

Government ministers of Morocco
1953 births
Living people
Moroccan civil servants
Naturalised citizens of Spain
Spanish people of Moroccan descent
Sahrawi politicians
People from Smara
Istiqlal Party politicians